Qi Qi may refer to:

 Qi Qi (dolphin) (淇淇)
 Qi Qi (gymnast) (祁琦)
 Qi Qi (host) (琪琪)
Qiqi (tilting vessel) (欹器)